The Kungkalenja (Kunkalanya) were an indigenous Australian people of the Channel Country in the state of Queensland.

Language
A short list of Kungkalenja words was compiled by W. G. Field and published in 1898.

Country
Little has been conserved of the Kungkalenja people. They inhabited the area north of the Karanja and Bedourie.

Alternative names
 Kunkulenje.
 Koonkoolenya.
 Koomkoolenya.
 Koonkalinga.
 Koonkalinye.

Some words
 wolka (sun)

Notes

Citations

Sources

Aboriginal peoples of Queensland